The IFFHS World's Best Top Goal Scorer is a football award given annually since 2020, and retroactively for the years 2011 to 2019, to the world's top goalscorer in the calendar year. The award is given by the International Federation of Football History & Statistics (IFFHS).

All international goals and all competitive goals for clubs playing in their country's top level division scored from 1 January to 31 December are taken into consideration.

Cristiano Ronaldo holds the record for most wins (4) while Lionel Messi holds the record for most goals in a calendar year (91 in 2012). Robert Lewandowski won the award with the fewest goals (47 in 2020). Ronaldo, Messi and Lewandowski are also the only players to have won the award more than once.

In 2021, the IFFHS awarded the World's Best Goal Scorer of the Decade, considering the years 2011 to 2020.

Men's winners

List of winners

Statistics

The World's Best Top Goal Scorer of the Second Decade (2011–2020) 

The final list includes the 41 players who scored 200 or more goals in top-tier national leagues, national cups, continental and international competitions with both club and national teams in the period of time from 1 January 2011 to 31 December 2020.

The results were posted on the IFFHS' official website on 4 January 2021.

All-time World's Best Goal Scorer ranking 

Bold indicates players currently active.
* indicates player has scored at least 500 goals for a single club.

Women's winners

List of winners

Statistics

See also 
International Federation of Football History & Statistics
IFFHS World's Best Club
IFFHS World's Best Player
IFFHS World's Best Goalkeeper
IFFHS World's Best International Goal Scorer
IFFHS World Team
IFFHS World's Best Club Coach
IFFHS World's Best National Coach

Notes

References 

Awards established in 2020
International Federation of Football History & Statistics
Association football trophies and awards